Balaram Mandir is a temple and a branch of Ramakrishna Mission and Ramakrishna Math located at  7, Girish Avenue, Baghbazar, Kolkata.

History 
Balaram Mandir was the residence of Balaram Bose, a disciple of Ramakrishna. On 1 May 1897, Swami Vivekananda organized a meeting in this house to finalize his plans to establish Ramakrishna Mission. In 1922, the converted into an independent place of worship for Ramakrishna-Vivekananda followers. In 2002, it became a branch centre of Ramakrishna Mission.

Activities 
Currently, Balaram Mandir is a branch of Ramakrishna Math and Mission. Some of the activities conducted by the centre are:
 Daily worships;
 Lectures and discourses;
 Celebration of births of Ramakrishna, Sarada Devi, Swami Vivekananda;
The centre also has a public library.

References 

Ramakrishna Math and Mission branches